Johann Kerseboom (died October 26, 1708) was a German painter. His date of birth is not known.

Kerseboom was born in Germany, and was the nephew of the painter Frederick Kerseboom. In the 1680s he traveled to England with Frederick, where he eventually set up his own practice. Some of the noted portraits that in the past were attributed to Frederick are now considered to be by him. A number of his portraits were engraved in mezzotint by engravers including John Smith.

References

Date of birth unknown
1690 deaths
German painters
German male painters
German portrait painters